Riva Bubber  is an Indian actress. After featuring in the Indian Arabic pop song Habibi Dah in 2001 Bubber made her debut as an actress with the role of Nikita in television series Kyun Hota Hai Pyarrr. Afterwards, she joined Kyunki Saas Bhi Kabhi Bahu Thi where she played the role of Damini. She is also known for her portrayal as Shabana Ghulam Haider in Beintehaa, Vimmi in Ram Milaayi Jodi and Priyamvada in Suryaputra Karn.

Early life
Riva Bubber was born in Mumbai, India to Ruby Bubber. She is of Punjabi descent and the youngest of three children.

Filmography

Television

References

External links 

Actresses from Mumbai
Indian television actresses
Indian soap opera actresses
Living people
Actresses in Tamil cinema
20th-century Indian actresses
21st-century Indian actresses
Year of birth missing (living people)